Monument Hill or Black Forest Divide Pass is a  elevation mountain pass in the Palmer Divide in central Colorado in the United States. The pass dividing the Arkansas River drainage system to the south and the Platte River drainage system to the north is the high point on  I-25 between Denver and Colorado Springs.

See also

 Castle Rock, Colorado
 Colorado Springs, Colorado
 Monument, Colorado

References

Mountain passes of Colorado
Landforms of El Paso County, Colorado
Interstate 25